Hermann Zotenberg (1836, Silesia – 1894, Paris) was an orientalist and Arabist.

He worked for the Bibliothèque nationale de France in Paris. His most celebrated work is his edition of the Chronique de Tabari (Paris, 1867–1871)

Works 
 Chronique de Tabari / Abū-Ǧaʿfar Muḥammad Ibn-Ǧarīr Ibn-Yāzid aṭ- Ṭabarī, Paris 1867-1871. (reprinted Paris, Maisonneuve 1958, 4 volumes)
 Charles, Robert Henry: The chronicle of John (c. 690 A.D.) : coptic bishop of Nikiu : being a history of Egypt before and during †the Arab conquest. Translated from Hermann Zotenberg's edition of the Ethiopic version, with an introduction, critical and linguistic notes, and an index of names [by] Robert Henry Charles, London 1916, (reprinted Amsterdam, APA/Philo 1981)
 Notice sur le livre de Barlaam et Joasaph : accompagnée d'extraits du texte grec et des versions arabe et éthiopienne, Paris, Impr. Nationale 1886
 Catalogue des manuscrits arabes / William MacGuckin de Slane. — Paris, Impr. Nationale 1883-1895 
 Catalogues des manuscrits syriaques et sabéens (Mandaïtes) de la bibliothèque nationale / Jules Antoine Taschereau. — (1874) 
 Chronique de Abou-Djafar-Moʿhammed-Ben-Djarir-Ben-Yezid Tabari / Abū-Ǧaʿfar Muḥammad Ibn-Ǧarīr Ibn-Yazīd aṭ- Ṭabarī. — Paris, Imprimerie Impériale 1867-1871 (3 volumes)
 Gui de Cambrai: Barlaam und Josaphat : französisches Gedicht des dreizehnten Jahrhunderts ; nebst Auszügen aus mehreren andern romanischen Versionen, ed. by Hermann Zotenberg and Paul Meyer. Stuttgart, Litterarischer Verein 1864 (Bibliothek des Litterarischen Vereins in Stuttgart ; 75) (reprinted Amsterdam 1966)
 Tabari: Mohammed, sceau des prophetes. Extrait de la Chronique de Tabari, traduit par Hermann Zotenberg, préfacée par Jacques Berque. Coll.: La Bibliothèque de l'Islam. Collections editees par Pierre Bernard. Paris Sindbad 1980; 
 (Ed. & translator): Histoire des rois des Perses par Abou Mansour 'abd Al-Malik ibn Mohammad ibn Isma'il al-Tha'alibi : historien et philologue arabe de la Perse (A.H. 350-430) : texte arabe, 1900, (reprinted Amsterdam, Apa-Oriental Press 1979 ) 
 Invasions des Visigoths et des arabes en France. Extrait du Tome II de l'Histoire Generale du Languedoc. Toulouse 1876.
  Histoire d' 'Alâ Al-Dîn ou la Lampe Merveilleuse. Texte Arabe publié avec une notice sur quelques manuscrits des Mille et une Nuits par H. Zotenberg, roy. 8vo. Paris, Imprimérie Nationale, 1888.

External links 
 Literatur von und über Hermann Zotenberg in the Catalogue of the Deutsche Nationalbibliothek
 

People from the Province of Silesia
1836 births
1894 deaths
Arabists
Arabic–French translators
French orientalists
French librarians
Members of the Société Asiatique
Corresponding members of the Saint Petersburg Academy of Sciences
19th-century translators
French bibliographers